Woodstock is a market town and civil parish,  north-west of Oxford in West Oxfordshire in the county of Oxfordshire, England. The 2011 Census recorded a parish population of 3,100.

Blenheim Palace, a UNESCO World Heritage Site, is next to Woodstock, in the parish of Blenheim. Winston Churchill was born in the palace in 1874 and buried in the nearby village of Bladon. Edward, elder son of King Edward III and heir apparent, was born in Woodstock Manor on 15 June 1330. In his lifetime he was commonly called Edward of Woodstock, but is known today as the Black Prince. In the reign of Queen Mary I, her half-sister Elizabeth was imprisoned in the gatehouse of Woodstock Manor.

History
The name Woodstock is Old English in origin, meaning a "dwelling in the woods". The Domesday Book of 1086 describes Woodstock (Wodestock, Wodestok, Wodestole) as a royal forest. Æthelred the Unready, king of England, is said to have held an assembly at Woodstock at which he issued a legal code now known as IX Æthelred.  King Henry I may have kept a menagerie in the park. Woodstock was the scene of King Henry II's courtship of Rosamund Clifford (Fair Rosamund). The market of the town was established when King Henry II gave Woodstock a Royal charter in 1179. The Bear Hotel in Park Street opposite The Oxfordshire Museum dates from the 13th century.

In the Hundred Rolls of 1279 Woodstock is described as a vill, but a burgess is alluded to in the same document, and it returned two members to parliament as a borough in 1302 and 1305. The earliest known municipal charter was that from Henry VI in 1453, establishing the vill of New Woodstock a free borough, with a merchant guild, and incorporating the burgesses under the title of the "Mayor and Commonalty of the Vill of New Woodstock." The borough was exempted from sending representatives to parliament, but started to return two members in the 16th century.

Near the village was Woodstock Palace, a residence that was popular with several English kings throughout the medieval period. The building was destroyed in the English Civil War. 60 years later the palace remains were cleared for the building of Blenheim Palace.  From the 16th century the town prospered by making gloves. In the 17th century the town was altered greatly, when the 1st Duke of Marlborough became a permanent resident.  The town has a successful fine steelwork industry by 1720 and by 1742 its products were of high enough quality to be considered viable diplomatic gifts. By the end of the 18th century this had developed into cut steel jewellery. Today it is largely dependent on tourists, many of whom visit Blenheim Palace.

Bell-foundry
By 1626 James Keene, who had a bell-foundry in Bedford, had started one in Woodstock. Until 1640 another member of the family, Humphrey Keene, was a bell-founder with him. James died in 1654 and was succeeded by his son Richard. Richard Keene apparently closed the Woodstock foundry in the 1680s but continued casting bells at Royston, Hertfordshire, until 1703.

Numerous parish churches still have one or more bells cast by the Keenes, including at Asthall, Bloxham, Cassington, Charlton-on-Otmoor, Chastleton, Chesterton, Duns Tew, Eynsham, Garsington, Islip, Kiddington, Merton, Milton, North Moreton, Oddington, Rousham, Sandford St Martin, Stanton Harcourt, Steeple Aston, Steeple Barton, Stratton Audley, Tackley, Towersey and Woodeaton in Oxfordshire, Stowe and Water Stratford in Buckinghamshire, Stanton in Gloucestershire, Middleton Cheney in Northamptonshire and Martley in Worcestershire.

Blenheim Palace

The Palace was designed by John Vanbrugh, in a heavy Italo-Corinthian style. It was designated to John Churchill, the first Duke of Marlborough. Most of the palace was paid for by the nation. Churchill had been given the manor in perpetuity in honour of his victories over the French and the Bavarians at the Battle of Blenheim in 1704, during the War of the Spanish Succession. The original manor, mostly ruined, was demolished as part of the project.

The greater part of the art treasures and curios were sold off in 1886, as was the great library collected by Charles Spencer, Earl of Sunderland, the son-in-law of the first Duke of Marlborough, in 1881. The magnificent park contains Fair Rosamund's Well, near which stood her bower. On the summit of a hill stands a column commemorating the duke. Blenheim Park forms a separate parish.

Elizabeth I
When Thomas Wyatt led an uprising in 1554 to depose Queen Mary I and put Princess Elizabeth on the throne in her place, Elizabeth was imprisoned in a lodge in Woodstock as a precaution. The lodge was used because the now lost Woodstock Palace or manor house was too dilapidated to house her. A survey in 1551 reported that "the mansion... for many years past hath been decayed." While imprisoned, Elizabeth wrote a poem. "Much suspected by [of] me, None proved can be." She was released in April 1555 after nearly a year in captivity.

The town

The River Glyme, in a steep valley, divides the town into New and Old Woodstock. The town has two main suburbs: Hensington to the south and east of the town centre, and Old Woodstock to the north. Woodstock Town Hall was built in 1766 to designs by Sir William Chambers. The almshouses were built in 1798 on behalf of Caroline, duchess of Marlborough. Chaucer's House was once home to Chancellor of England, Thomas Chaucer, thought to be the son of the poet Geoffrey Chaucer.

The Church of England parish church of St Mary Magdalene has a Norman doorway. The church has a turret clock that John Briant of Hertford made in 1792. The parish is now part of the Benefice of Blenheim, which also includes Begbroke, Bladon, Shipton-on-Cherwell and Yarnton.  The Oxfordshire Museum, the county museum of Oxfordshire, occupies a large historic house, Fletcher's House, in the centre of Woodstock. The museum has a garden containing works of art and a Dinosaur Garden with a full-size replica of a Megalosaurus.  Both the primary school and The Marlborough School, the secondary school, are in Shipton Road. There is nursery provision through WUFA (Woodstock Under Fives Association). Oxford School of Drama is at Sansom's Farm, in the north of Woodstock parish.  The current Mayor of the Town is Elizabeth Poskitt.

Sport and leisure
Woodstock has a Non-League football club, Woodstock Town, who play at New Road, and were promoted to the Hellenic Football League Premier Division for the 2008–09 season. They are currently in Hellenic League Division 2 North.

Citations

General and cited sources

External links

 Wake Up to Woodstock – guide to events, services, accommodation and news
 Woodstock Guide – guide to events, amenities, services, businesses and accommodation
 Woodstock Website – guide to accommodation, attractions, businesses and information

 
Civil parishes in Oxfordshire
English royal forests
Market towns in Oxfordshire
West Oxfordshire District